"The Zeppo" is episode thirteen of season three of Buffy the Vampire Slayer. It was written by Dan Vebber, directed by James Whitmore, Jr., and first broadcast on January 26, 1999. Feeling left out by the gang, Xander ends up accompanying a student named Jack O'Toole. Meanwhile, the rest of the gang are trying to stop an apocalypse.

Plot
Xander helps out the gang with another demon vanquishing, but Buffy worries about his safety and asks him to stay out of the fighting, upsetting him.

When a student throws him a football, Xander drops it onto Jack O'Toole's lunch, resulting in Jack threatening to beat him up. Cordelia, having witnessed the event, tells Xander he is useless and extraneous, since all of his friends are slayers, werewolves, witches, and watchers, while he is nothing. Meanwhile, Giles informs Buffy that the end of the world is near. The Sisterhood of Jhe, a group of fierce demons, is planning to reopen the Hellmouth.

Xander gets himself a car in the hope it will make him useful and cool, but accidentally rear-ends Jack, who is sitting in a parked car. Jack threatens Xander with a knife, but when a cop shows up, Xander covers for Jack and gains his respect. They go to get the rest of Jack's friends who, being dead, need to be raised from their graves.

Buffy, Willow and Giles are researching in the library. Giles leaves to contact some spirits and hopefully get their help with stopping the sisterhood.

Xander takes Jack and his group of friends to get supplies. He spots Willow leaving the magic shop and tries to talk to her; she tells him that she loves him before hurrying off to help Buffy. When Jack and friends try to initiate Xander into their group, he flees. He rescues Faith from a member of the sisterhood by hitting it with his car, then they go to Faith's motel room where she seduces him. Afterwards, she kicks him out, clothes in hand.

Meanwhile, back at the library, Willow and Giles struggle to get Oz (in werewolf form) away from the Hellmouth. They sedate him and lock him in the basement.

Xander realizes that Jack and his group have built a bomb. He seeks help from Buffy, but she is too busy having an emotional encounter with Angel. On his way to see Giles to warn him, Xander sees Jack's zombie group and drags one of them with his car until he confesses the location of the bomb. Xander finds the bomb in the school basement and vanquishes three of Jack's zombie minions, but Jack shows up and they fight. Xander positions himself between Jack and the exit door so that Jack has no hope of escaping before the bomb explodes. Jack defuses the bomb with seconds to spare and turns to leave, swearing revenge. He opens the door, releasing Oz, who immediately attacks and eats him. Meanwhile, at the library, Buffy, Angel, Faith, Giles and Willow fight off a giant multi-headed monster and the members of the Sisterhood of Jhe before successfully closing the Hellmouth.

The next day, the bruised Buffy, Willow, Giles, and Oz sit at a table discussing how they saved the world from destruction. Oz finds himself oddly disgusted by his appetite after waking up. Xander, not knowing anything of their battle and vice versa, comes by to chat with them. After a few seconds of talk, Xander decides to keep his harrowing night-long adventure to himself (aware that his friends will never believe such a story, no matter how he tells it). As he walks away, Cordelia once again taunts him over being left out of the group, but Xander merely smiles and walks by... quietly secure and confident in his place in the world and realizing that with or without Buffy, he can survive on his own.

Production details
Dan Vebber wrote two scripts for the show: "Lovers Walk" and "The Zeppo". Although there are earlier episodes where Xander is central to the plot (e.g. "The Pack"), this episode is unusual in that the story is largely told from Xander's point of view. The world-saving activities of the main cast are portrayed as secondary until the plot lines eventually converge.

Reception and influence
Noel Murray of The A.V. Club wrote that "The Zeppo" had become a favorite episode of his, saying, "What I loved about 'The Zeppo' is how Xander's feelings of abandonment pervade the structure of the episode, which is filled with moments that are (intentionally) dramatically unsatisfying." In Entertainment Weekly list of the 25 best Whedonverse episodes—including episodes from Buffy, as well as Angel, Firefly and Dollhouse—"The Zeppo" placed at No. 23. TV Squad's Keith McDuffee listed "The Zeppo" as the fifth best episode of the series. The episode was nominated for an Emmy Award for Outstanding Makeup in a Series.

The episode has proved influential on later television writers. In his "Production Notes: Doodles in the Margins of Time", Doctor Who executive producer Russell T Davies said that he was inspired by "The Zeppo", along with the Star Trek: The Next Generation episode "Lower Decks", when writing the 2006 "Doctor-lite" episode "Love & Monsters", which started an annual tradition for an episode with little involvement of the lead cast. Joss Whedon himself cites it as influential to his later series Marvel's Agents of S.H.I.E.L.D.

References

External links

 

Buffy the Vampire Slayer (season 3) episodes
1999 American television episodes
Television episodes about zombies
Television episodes about bullying
Television episodes about gangs